Nordic Mining ASA is a mining company in Norway. Focussing on exploration and production of industrial minerals and metals, the company is primarily involved in rutile, quartz, and lithium. The company's shares are listed on Oslo Axess.

History 
Originally an integrated part of Norwegian petroleum company Rocksource ASA, today's Nordic Mining ASA was de-merged and established as an independent public limited company on 23 February 2006, and received Rocksource ASA's assets and liabilities related to metals and minerals. In September 2006, Nordic Mining ASA also acquired claims to the Engebøfjell rutile deposit from ConocoPhillips Investments Norge AS.

In the Arctic Environmental Responsibility Index (AERI) Nordic Mining is ranked no. 42 out of 120 oil, gas, and mining companies involved in resource extraction north of the Arctic Circle.

Information 
Nordic Mining ASA is a Norwegian public limited company (allmennaksjeselskap), registered with VAT number NO 989 796 739 in the Norwegian Register of Business Enterprises. Listed on the Oslo Stock Exchange market Oslo Axess since 14 September 2007, Nordic Mining ASA shares have ticker symbol NOM.OAX and ISIN NO 001 031 7340. They are also listed on the Nasdaq OMX market First North (ticker symbol: NOMo.ST) in Stockholm, Sweden.

Subsidiaries and projects 
Subsidiaries

Domestic projects

International projects

Engebø Project 

The Engebø Project at Engebø in Naustdal, Sogn og Fjordane, is operated and fully owned by Nordic Mining ASA via Nordic Rutile AS. The rutile deposit at Engebø is among the largest in the world. Engebø also contains almandine garnet. The project has an estimated production time of 50 years. In April 2015, The Ministry of Local Government and Modernisation approved the Engebø Project, parallelly with The Ministry of Climate and Environment granting a related discharge permit.

Kvinnherad Project 
The Kvinnherad Project at Nesodden in Kvinnherad, Hordaland (a neighbouring county of Sogn og Fjordane), is operated and fully owned by Nordic Mining ASA via Nordic Quartz AS. Kvinnherad contains both normal and high-purity quartz.

Øksfjord Peninsula Project 
The Øksfjord Peninsula Project in Reinfjord and Lokkarfjord in Øksfjord, Finnmark – Finnmárku, is operated and fully owned directly by Nordic Mining ASA. The project is located in the Seiland Igneous Province, known for several types of metals: nickel, copper, cobalt, platinum/palladium, and gold.

Subsea mineral resources 
Nordic Ocean Resources AS is a subsidiary of Nordic Mining ASA (80 percent) and Ocean Miners AS (20 percent). The company co-operates with Norwegian petroleum company Statoil ASA and the Norwegian University of Science and Technology regarding subsea mineral resources.

Keliber Oy 
Keliber Oy  is a Finnish limited company operating lithium deposits in Kaustinen and Kokkola, Central Ostrobothnia. Approximately 16.3 percent of Keliber Oy's shares are owned by Nordic Mining ASA.

Alumina patent 
In October 2015, Nordic Mining ASA and the Institute for Energy Technology were granted a patent, the so-called 'alumina patent', on a new technology, the so-called 'Aranda-Mastin process', for extraction of alumina from alternative mineral sources.

Maps

References

External links 
 Nordic Mining ASA 

Mining companies of Norway
Companies listed on Oslo Axess
Companies based in Oslo
Norwegian companies established in 2006